The 2020–21 South Carolina Gamecocks men's basketball team represented the University of South Carolina during the 2020–21 NCAA Division I men's basketball season. The team is led by ninth-year head coach Frank Martin, and play their home games at Colonial Life Arena in Columbia, South Carolina as a member of the Southeastern Conference.

Previous season
The Gamecocks finished the 2019–20 season 18–13, 10–8 in SEC play to finish in a tie for sixth place. As the No. 6 seed in the SEC tournament, they were set to take on Arkansas in the second round before the remainder of the SEC Tournament was canceled due to the ongoing COVID-19 pandemic.

Offseason

Departures

Incoming Transfers

2020 recruiting class

Roster

Schedule and results
The exhibition game against Coker scheduled for November 25 was cancelled due to a delay in the delivery of Coker’s COVID-19 testing results.

|-
!colspan=12 style=|Regular season

|-
!colspan=12 style=| SEC tournament

References

South Carolina Gamecocks
South Carolina Gamecocks men's basketball seasons
South Carolina Gamecocks
South Carolina Gamecocks